Éliot Grondin (born 19 April 2001) is a Canadian snowboarder competing in the snowboard cross event.

Career

World Championships
Grondin has won three medals at the FIS Snowboarding Junior World Championships, with a silver in 2018 and 2019, while winning gold in 2021. With his gold medal win, he became the first Canadian in history to win the title.

At the FIS Freestyle Ski and Snowboarding World Championships 2021, Grondin won bronze in the snowboard cross event.

Winter Olympics
In 2018, Grondin competed at his first Olympics at the age of 16, becoming the youngest male athlete on Team Canada. Grondin finished in 36th place in the snowboard cross event at the games. 

In January 2022, Grondin was named to Canada's 2022 Olympic team. Grondin would go onto win the silver medal in the snowboard cross event. Grondin would later win the bronze medal in the inaugural mixed team snowboard cross event with compatriot Meryeta O'Dine.

References

External links
 

2001 births
Living people
Snowboarders at the 2018 Winter Olympics
Snowboarders at the 2022 Winter Olympics
Canadian male snowboarders
Olympic snowboarders of Canada
Medalists at the 2022 Winter Olympics
Olympic medalists in snowboarding
Olympic silver medalists for Canada
Olympic bronze medalists for Canada